Yegorova, Egorova or Jegorova (Russian: Егорова) may refer to:

Women
 Anna Yegorova (1916–2009), Russian pilot during WW2
 Daria Egorova (born 1996), Russian cyclist
 Irina Nikolayevna Yegorova (born 1940), Russian speed skater 
 Lyubov Yegorova (ballerina) (1880–1972), Russian dancer and teacher
 Lyubov Yegorova (cross-country skier), also spelled Ljubov Jegorova (born 1966), Russian cross-country skier
 Natalia Egorova (born 1966), Russian tennis player
 Olga Egorova aka Tsaplya (born 1968), Russian visual artist and director, co-founder of the Chto Delat (What Is to Be Done?) art collective 
  (born 1955), Russian judge
 Olga Nikolayevna Yegorova (born 1972), Russian middle-distance runner
  (born 1967), Russian actress
 Polina Alexeyevna Egorova (born 2000), Russian swimmer
 Tatiana Vladimirovna Egorova (1930–2007), Russian botanist
 Valentina Yegorova (born 1964), Russian long-distance runner
 Violetta Egorova (born 1969), Russian pianist

Places

Kazakhstan 
 Yegorova River , 49°53'35.38"N, 84°43'26.65"E
 Yegorova River , 49°21'43.31"N, 84°43'41.52"E

Latvia 
 , Kastuļina Parish
 , Mākoņkalns Parish

Russia 
 Yegorova River , Nenets Autonomous Okrug
 Yegorova, Krasnovishersky District, Perm Krai
 Yegorova, Kudymkarsky District, Perm Krai
 , Ilyinsky District, Perm Krai
 Yegorova River , Sakha Republic
 Yegorova River , Zabaykalsky Krai

See also
 Yegorov (disambiguation), the male version of the surname

de:Jegorowa